Tchad Blake (born 1955) is an American record producer, audio engineer, mixer and musician.

A native of Baytown, Texas, he has worked with numerous artists and musicians, including  Al Green, American Music Club, Ani DiFranco, Apartment 26, Arctic Monkeys, Bernard Fanning, Blitzen Trapper, Bonnie Raitt, Brazilian Girls, Cibo Matto, Crowded House, David Rhodes, Delta Spirit, Elvis Costello, Finn Brothers, Fiona Apple, Fishbone, Gerard Way, Gomez, Haley Bonar, Halloween, Alaska, Jed Davis, Kula Shaker, Liam Finn, Lisa Germano, Los Lobos, Marike Jager, Nico Vega, November 2nd, Pearl Jam, Pell Mell, Peter Gabriel, Phantom Planet, Phish, Richard Thompson, Sam Phillips, Sheryl Crow, Soul Coughing, State Radio, Stina Nordenstam, Suzanne Vega, T-Bone Burnett, The Bad Plus, The Bangles, The Black Keys, The Dandy Warhols, The Last Shadow Puppets, The Pretenders, Tom Gallo, Tom Waits, Tracy Chapman, Travis, and U2, among others.

Blake often partners with Mitchell Froom, and the two formed Latin Playboys with David Hidalgo and Louie Pérez of Los Lobos.

Blake is known for his use of binaural recording, an experimental recording technique which employs two microphones to create a 3-D stereophonic sound.

He has won a number of Grammy Awards, beginning with Best Engineered Album, Non-Classical  and  Best Rock Album for Sheryl Crow's The Globe Sessions (1998).  He won another Grammy for Best Engineered Album, Non-Classical for his work on Suzanne Vega's Beauty & Crime (2007).  Blake won two Grammys for his work with The Black Keys on 2010's Brothers.

In 2009 Blake took part in a guest lecture in the Department of Music and Audio at the University of Kent.

References

External links
 
 Tchad Blake on mixing The Black Keys' Brothers and Blakroc records
 Tchad Blake on mixing The Black Keys' El Camino record

1955 births
Living people
Record producers from Texas
American audio engineers
Real World Records artists
Grammy Award winners
People from Baytown, Texas
Latin Playboys members